Act or ACT may refer to:

Arts and entertainment 
 A.C.T, a Swedish band
 Act (band), a British band
 Act (drama), a segment of a play or opera
 ACT Music, a German music label
 ACT Theatre, in Seattle, Washington, US
 Acting,  theatrical performance
 Acts, a 2012 album by American band RNDM
 American Conservatory Theater, in San Francisco, California, US

Business organizations 
 AdaCore, formerly Ada Core Technologies, Ada specialist software company
 Advanced Cell Technology, stem cell company
 Advanced Computer Techniques, a U.S. software company 1962–1994
 Applied Computer Techniques, later Apricot Computers, UK
 Atria Convergence Technologies, a telecommunications company in India
 Aviation Composite Technology, an aircraft manufacturer in the Philippines

Education 
 ACT (nonprofit organization), provides assessments etc. for US school students etc.
 ACT (test), for college admission, US
 Asian College of Technology, Cebu City, Philippines
 Australian College of Theology

Government / military 
 AC Transit, a transit agency serving Alameda and Contra Costa Counties, California
Advanced Clean Trucks Regulation, a rule made by the California Air Resources Board which requires trucks to decarbonize
Advanced Concepts Team, a research team of the European Space Agency
 Agency for Community Transit, a paratransit system for Madison County Transit, Illinois
 Allied Command Transformation, a NATO strategic command
 Azienda comunale del traffico, a former transport operator in Lugano, Switzerland

Political parties and campaigning/advocacy groups 
 ACT Alberta, a Canadian coalition to raise awareness about human trafficking
 ACT Alliance, an alliance of churches for coordinating humanitarian assistance and development work
 ACT New Zealand, a political party in New Zealand
 ACT-CIS Partylist, a political party in the Philippines
 ACT Teachers Partylist, a political party in the Philippines
 ACT! for America, an advocacy group in the United States
 Action for Children's Television, an organization dedicated to improvements in children's television
 Agir (France) (French for Act), a political party in France
 Alliance for Change and Transparency, a political party in Tanzania
 Amazon Conservation Team, a non-profit organization that works to protect the Amazon rainforest
 America Coming Together, a US political group

Professional organizations 
 Academy of Clinical Thyroidologists, United States
 Alliance of Concerned Teachers, Philippines
 American College of Toxicology
 Association for Citizenship Teaching, UK
 Association for Competitive Technology, international association of software developers
 Association of Cinematograph, Television and Allied Technicians, UK
 Association of Corporate Treasurers, UK

Sports 
 Australia national cricket team
 American Canadian Tour, a stock car racing series

Other organizations 
 ACT (now Together for Short Lives), a children's charity in the United Kingdom
 Addenbrooke's Charitable Trust, a UK charity
 Anglican Church in Thailand
 The Association of Commercial Television in Europe, a group which represents the business interests of the commercial television sector at the EU institutions
Associated Container Transport (ACT) a consortium of five British shipping companies - Ben Line, Blue Star Line, Cunard (Port Line), Ellerman Lines and the Harrison Line

Law
 Act (document), a document recording the legality of a transaction or contract  
 Acting (law) refers to someone temporarily exercising the powers of a vacant position
 Act of Parliament, Act of Congress, or Act of Tynwald, a statute or law passed by a legislature
 Advance corporation tax, a tax collected in the UK until 1999

Places 
 Australian Capital Territory, the territory in which the Australian capital city of Canberra is seated

Transport 
 ACT, the IATA code for Waco Regional Airport, Texas, US 
 ACT, the National Rail code for Ascot railway station, Berkshire, UK

Science, technology, and mathematics

Computing
 ACT-R, a symbolic cognitive architecture
 Apple Certified Trainer, one of the Apple certification programs
 ACT (NASDAQ), Automated Confirmation of Transactions, a trade reporting and clearing system
 Act! CRM, Contact Management and CRM software

Medicine 
 Acceptance and commitment therapy, a type of cognitive-behavioral therapy
 Acetylcholine, (ACt/ACh) a neurotransmitter
 Activated clotting time
 Adoptive cell transfer, transfer of cells into a patient, usually immune system cells
 Artemisinin based combination therapy, a treatment for malaria
 Assertive community treatment, a system for treating mental illness

Other uses in science, technology, and mathematics
 Act or S-act, the action of a monoid on a set, or a semiautomaton
 ACT (audio format), a file format
 Ford ACT, a transit system
 Astrographic Catalog/Tycho or Tycho-2 Catalogue
 Atacama Cosmology Telescope, Chile
 ACT, a codon for the amino acid Threonine

Other uses
 ACT mouthwash, produced by Chattem
 Acting (rank), temporary military rank
 Achterhooks, ISO 639-3 language code, a Dutch dialect
 Courtney Act, Australian drag queen, singer, and television personality